Leo Keith Thorsness (February 14, 1932 – May 2, 2017) was a colonel in the United States Air Force who received the Medal of Honor for his actions in the Vietnam War. He was awarded the medal for an air engagement on April 19, 1967. He was shot down two weeks later and spent almost six years in captivity in North Vietnam as a prisoner of war. After his military service, Thorsness served one term in the Washington State Senate.

Early life, education, and early career
Thorsness was born February 14, 1932, in Walnut Grove, Minnesota, where his family had a farm.  There, he earned the Eagle Scout award from the Boy Scouts of America. He is one of only eleven known Eagle Scouts who also received the Medal of Honor. The others are Aquilla J. Dyess and Mitchell Paige of the U.S. Marine Corps; Robert Edward Femoyer and Jay Zeamer Jr. of the U.S. Army Air Forces; Arlo L. Olson, Benjamin L. Salomon, and Walter Joseph Marm Jr. of the United States Army; and Britt K. Slabinski, Eugene B. Fluckey and Thomas R. Norris of the United States Navy. In 2010, Thorsness received the Distinguished Eagle Scout Award.

He attended South Dakota State College in Brookings, South Dakota, where he met his future wife, Gaylee Anderson, also a freshman. They married in 1953 and had a daughter, Dawn.

Thorsness enlisted in the Air Force in 1951 at the age of 19 because his brother was then serving in the Korean War. In 1954, he received his commission as an officer and his wings with a rating of pilot through the USAF Aviation Cadet program in Class 54-G. He later earned a bachelor's degree from the University of Omaha in 1964, and a master's degree in Defense Systems Management from the University of Southern California. His initial assignment was as a pilot in the Strategic Air Command and Tactical Air Command, but he completed training as a fighter pilot and flew both F-84 and F-100 jets before transitioning to the F-105 Thunderchief.

In the autumn of 1966, after completing F-105 "Wild Weasel" training at George AFB, California, he was assigned to the 355th Tactical Fighter Wing based at Takhli Royal Thai Air Force Base in Thailand, flying as aircraft commander in F-105F's, tasked with locating and destroying North Vietnamese surface-to-air missile (SAM) sites.

Medal of Honor mission
On April 19, 1967, Major Thorsness  and his Electronic Warfare Officer, Captain Harold E. Johnson, flying F-105F AF Ser. No. 63-8301, led Kingfish flight (three F-105F Weasel aircraft and an F-105D single-seater) on a Wild Weasel SAM suppression mission. The strike force target was JCS target 22.00, the Xuan Mai army training compound, near heavily defended Hanoi. Thorsness directed Kingfish 03 and 04, the second element of F-105s, to troll north while he and his wingman maneuvered south, forcing defending gunners to divide their attention. Thorsness located two SAM sites and fired a Shrike missile to attack one, whose radar went off the air. He destroyed the second with cluster bombs, scoring a direct hit.

After this initial success, matters turned for the worse. Kingfish 02, crewed by Majors Thomas M. Madison and Thomas J. Sterling, flying aircraft F-105F AF Ser. No. 63-8341, was hit by anti-aircraft fire and both crewmen had to eject. Unknown to Thorsness, Kingfish 03 and 04 had been attacked by MiG-17s flying a low-altitude wagon wheel defensive formation. The afterburner of one of the F-105s wouldn't light and the element had disengaged and returned to base, leaving Kingfish 01 to fight solo.

As their F-105 circled the parachutes of Kingfish 02-Alpha and 02-Bravo, relaying the position to Crown, the airborne search and rescue HC-130 command aircraft, Johnson spotted a MiG-17 off their right wing. 8301, though not designed for air-to-air combat, responded well as Thorsness attacked the MiG and destroyed it with 20-mm cannon fire, just as a second MiG closed on his tail. Low on fuel, Thorsness outran his pursuers and left the battle area to rendezvous with a KC-135 tanker over Laos.

Thorsness described the incident:

It appeared the MiG was going after the chutes so I took off after him. I was a little high, dropped down to about 1000 feet, and headed north after him. We were doing about 550 knots and really catching up fast. At about 3000 feet (range) I fired a burst but missed. I lined him up again and was closing very fast. I was a bit below him now. At 700 feet or so I pull my trigger and pulled the pipper through him. Parts of his left started coming off. Suddenly I realized that Harry Johnson was frantically trying to get my attention. There were a couple of MiGs on our tail! If I had hit that MiG dead on, we probably would have swallowed some of his debris. But we got him! I lit the burner, dropped down as low as possible, and ducked into the hills west of Hanoi. The MiGs could not keep up with us.

As this occurred, the initial element of the rescue force—a pair of A-1E "Sandies"—arrived to locate the position of the downed crewmen before calling in the waiting HH-53 Jolly Green helicopters orbiting at a holding point over Laos. Thorsness, with only 500 rounds of ammunition left, turned back from the tanker to fly RESCAP (rescue combat air patrol) for the Sandies and update them on the situation and terrain. As Thorsness approached the area, briefing the Sandies, he spotted MiG-17s in a wagon wheel orbit around him and attacked, probably destroying another that flew across his path.

He commented:

One of the MiGs flew right into my gunsight at about 2000 feet (range). I pulled the trigger and saw pieces start falling off the aircraft. They hadn't seen us, but they did now! Johnson shouted at me that we had four more MiGs on our tail and they were closing fast. I dropped down on the deck, sometimes as low as fifty feet, hit the burner, and twisted through the hills and valleys trying to lose them.

Pairs of MiGs attacked each propeller-driven Sandy as it came out of its turn in search orbit, shooting down the leader (Maj. John S. Hamilton in A-1E 52-133905) with cannon fire when he failed to heed warnings from Sandy 02 to break into the attack, and forced the wingman into a series of repeated evasive turns. Sandy 02 reported the situation and Thorsness advised him to keep turning and announced his return.

Although all of his ammunition had been depleted, Thorsness reversed and flew back to the scene, hoping in some way to draw the MiGs away from the surviving A-1. However, as he re-engaged, Panda flight from the 355th TFW strike force arrived back in the area. It had dropped its ordnance on the target and was en route to its post-strike aerial refueling when Kingfish 02 went down. Panda had jettisoned its wing tanks, making the rescue radar controller reluctant to use it to CAP the rescue effort, but it filled its internal tanks and returned to North Vietnam at high altitude to conserve fuel.

Panda's four F-105s burst through the defensive circle at high speed, then engaged the MiGs in a turning dogfight, permitting Kingfish 01 to depart the area after a 50-minute engagement against SAMs, antiaircraft guns, and MiGs. Panda 01 (Capt William E. Eskew) shot down a MiG, during which the surviving Sandy escaped, and he and his wingman Panda 02 (Capt Paul A. Seymour) each damaged one of the others. Two other MiGs were shot down by members of a third F-105 strike flight, Nitro 01 (Major Jack W. Hunt) and Nitro 03 (Maj Theodore G. "Ted" Tolman), in another of the 17 MiG engagements on this mission.

Again low on fuel and facing nightfall, Thorsness was headed towards a tanker when Panda 03 (Capt Howard L. Bodenhamer), an F-105 of the flight that had rescued Sandy 02, transmitted by radio that he was critically low on fuel. Thorsness quickly calculated that Kingfish 01 had sufficient fuel to fly to Udorn, near the Mekong River and 200 miles closer, so he vectored the tanker toward Panda 03. When within 60 miles of Udorn, he throttled back to idle and "glided" toward the base, touching down "long" (mid-runway) as his fuel totalizer indicated empty tanks.

The mission was recreated by The History Channel as part of Episode 12 ("Long Odds") of its series Dogfights, and first telecast on January 19, 2007. However, Kingfish Flight was incorrectly referred to as "Cadillac" flight.

Prisoner of war
On April 30, 1967, on their 93rd mission (seven shy of completing their tours), Thorsness and Johnson were shot down by a Mikoyan-Gurevich MiG-21 over North Vietnam while flying aircraft F-105F, AF Ser. No. 62-4447. He had flown the morning mission to the Hanoi area as Wild Weasel leader, then assigned himself as a spare aircraft for the afternoon mission because of a shortage of crews. One of Carbine flight aborted with radio problems, and Thorsness filled in as Carbine 03, leading the second element.

While still inbound over northwest North Vietnam, communications were disrupted when an ejection seat emergency beeper went off aboard one of the F-105s. Despite being observed by early warning radar locations, two MiG-21s approached Carbine flight from behind and unseen. Just as Thorsness got an instrument indication that the flight was being painted by airborne radar, he saw an F-105 going down in flames that eventually was identified as his own wingman, Carbine 04 (1st Lt Robert Abbott, in F-105D, AF Ser. No. 59-1726), shot down by an Atoll missile. Within a minute, his own aircraft was also hit with a heat-seeking missile fired by the MiGs.

Thorsness and Johnson ejected. Separated from each other by a ridge, they were the object of a three-hour rescue effort involving the entire strike force as a covering force. Two F-105D aircraft were directed by Crown to provide RESCAP (as Tomahawk flight) until the combat search and rescue (CSAR) forces could arrive on station. Both aircraft were hit by Atoll missiles from MiG 21s, with F-105D, AF Ser. No. 61-0130, piloted by Capt Joe Abbott being shot down, and wingman Maj Al Lenski limping back to Thailand. In addition, one of the A-1 "Sandy" aircraft was hit while one of the rescue Jolly Greens developed hydraulic problems and had to abort, thus ending the CSAR mission. Poor communications, heavy MiG engagements and standard operating procedures which did not allow only one CSAR helicopter to remain on station, made the effort futile and all the men were captured. CSAR forces were again launched the next day but none of the downed airmen were located. The mission is described in great detail, including verbatim transcripts of radio transmissions, in both Thud Ridge and Thud, written by Col Jack Broughton, member of Waco flight and another of the RESCAP crews involved in the incident.

His uncooperativeness towards his captors earned him a year in solitary confinement and severe back injuries due to torture. The Medal of Honor was awarded to Thorsness during his captivity, but not announced until his release in 1973 to prevent the Vietnamese from using it against Thorsness, as was the Air Force Cross awarded to Capt Johnson for the same mission. Capt. Abbott was released from captivity on February 18, 1973, while Thorsness, Johnson, and 1st Lt Abbott were released on March 4, 1973, during Operation Homecoming.

Injuries incurred during the ejection and aggravated by the torture Thorsness was subjected to disqualified him medically from further flying in the Air Force and he retired on October 25, 1973 at the rank of colonel.

Col. Thorsness was a command pilot in the United States Air Force with 5,000 flying hours in L-21, T-6 Texan, T-28 Trojan, T-33 Shooting Star, F-84B and D Thunderjet, F-84F Thunderstreak, F-100C and D Super Sabre, and F-105B, D, and F Thunderchief aircraft.

Post-military life

From 1979 to 1985, Thorsness served as Director of Civic Affairs for Litton Industries. He then served as a state senator in Washington. Following his retirement, he served on the board of directors of the Congressional Medal of Honor Foundation.  He moved from Catalina, Arizona, to Madison, Alabama, with his wife in early 2008 to be close to family.

In 2004, the University of Richmond announced the establishment of an endowed chair in leadership and ethics named in honor of Thorsness. The Colonel Leo K. and Gaylee Thorsness Endowed Chair in Ethical Leadership was funded by a $1,000,000 gift organized by W. Thomas Matthews, President and CEO of the Global Private Client Group at Smith Barney. Thorsness also served as Distinguished Leader in Residence at the Jepson School of Leadership Studies. The Thorsness chair is held by Donelson R. Forsyth, a social psychologist with expertise in group dynamics.

Thorsness' autobiography, Surviving Hell: A POW's Journey, was published in December 2008.

Thorsness died on May 2, 2017, in St. Augustine, Florida, at the age of eighty-five. According to his wife, Gaylee, the cause of death was leukemia. He is buried with full military honors at Arlington National Cemetery.
In August 2020, Thorsness was named the Class Exemplar for the United States Air Force Academy's Class of 2023.

Political career
In the 1974 U.S. Senate election in South Dakota, Thorsness was the Republican nominee against the incumbent Democrat George McGovern. It was believed that McGovern faced possible defeat for allegedly having neglected the state during his long 1972 presidential campaign. By May 1973, McGovern had already begun campaigning for reelection. Thorsness had just been repatriated after six years as a prisoner of war in North Vietnam. He accused McGovern of having given aid and comfort to the enemy and of having prolonged Thorsness' time as a POW. McGovern replied that if there had been no war, there would have been no POWs, and that everything he had done had been towards the goal of ending the war sooner. However, the war did not become a significant issue in the Senate race. Instead, the campaign was dominated by farm policy differences and economic concerns over the 1973–75 recession. Thorsness charged McGovern with being a "part-time senator" more concerned with national office and with spending over $2 million on his re‑election bid, while McGovern labelled Thorsness a carpetbagger because he was originally from Minnesota. In a year in which Democrats were advantaged by the after-effects of the Watergate scandal, McGovern won re-election in November 1974 with 53 percent of the votes cast.

Thorsness settled in Seattle Washington, and was elected to the state senate on November 8, 1988.  In accordance with Washington State law, he immediately became the senator from District 11 to serve the unexpired term of Avery Garrett, who died in April 1988. In January 1989, Thorsness took the oath of office for a four-year term. In the state senate Thorsness sponsored a bill dubbed the "Truth Bill" on March 3, 1990. The legislature unanimously passed the measure, SJM 8020, urging the Federal government to release information about 30,000 U.S. soldiers listed as either prisoners of war or missing in action in conflicts dating back to World War II. It further urged the United States Congress to pass a similar measure, HR3603, that would force the federal government to declassify information pertaining to over 30,000 missing American servicemen. In sponsoring the bill, Thorsness said that the government kept the information classified to protect intelligence sources, but that the sources are no longer useful because the conflict occurred decades ago. In 1992, he was an unsuccessful candidate in the Republican primary election for United States Senate. After a single term, Thorsness retired to Indianola, Washington.

Awards and decorations 
Thorsness' awards and decorations include:

Medal of Honor citation 

The President of the United States in the name of the Congress takes pride in presenting the Medal of Honor to
LIEUTENANT COLONEL LEO K. THORSNESS
UNITED STATES AIR FORCE
for service as set forth in the following citation:

Electoral history

See also

 List of Medal of Honor recipients for the Vietnam War
  In May 2010 Goodfellow AFB, TX dedicated a visiting officer's quarters in his name.  Thorsness Manor.

Notes

References
 Correll, John T. "Full Day," AIR FORCE Magazine, (June 2005) detailed, illustrated summary with map
 Frisbee, John L. "Valor: Wild, Wild Weasel", AIR FORCE Magazine, (April 1985) abbreviated summary of mission
 "Rendezvous with the Rattlesnake"
 Bell, Ken (1993). 100 Missions North, Brassey's (US), 
 Broughton, Jacksel (1969). Thud Ridge, Bantam, 
 Davis, Larry (1986). Wild Weasel: The SAM Suppression Story, Squadron/Signal Publications. 
 Drendel, Lou (1986). Thud, Squadron/Signal Publications. 
 Michel, Marshall L. (2004). Clashes: Air Combat Over North Vietnam 1965–1972, Naval Institute Press, 
 Futrell, L. Frank, et al. (1976) United States Air Force in Southeast Asia: Aces and Aerial Victories – 1965–1973, Air University, Headquarters USAF, on-line edition

External links

 Graphic depiction of 63–8301 Note: on the date of the MoH mission, tail codes were not yet in use in the USAF
 American Valor – Leo K. Thorsness
 Air Force bio, Leo K. Thorsness
 Thorsness Bio
 POW Network bio that includes his legislative efforts on behalf of MIA's
 Interview at the Pritzker Military Museum & Library
 

1932 births
2017 deaths
People from Walnut Grove, Minnesota
United States Air Force Medal of Honor recipients
United States Air Force personnel of the Vietnam War
American torture victims
Aviators from Minnesota
Burials at Arlington National Cemetery
Military personnel from Minnesota
Recipients of the Silver Star
Recipients of the Distinguished Flying Cross (United States)
Recipients of the Air Medal
Shot-down aviators
South Dakota Republicans
United States Air Force officers
Vietnam War prisoners of war
Washington (state) Republicans
Washington (state) state senators
Writers from Minnesota
Vietnam War recipients of the Medal of Honor